The Ford Puma is a nameplate used by Ford Motor Company for several car models. The "Puma" name is also used on variants of the Duratorq engine. 

 Ford Puma (sport compact), a 1997–2001 sport compact car
 Ford Puma (crossover), a 2019–present subcompact crossover SUV
 Ford Puma Rally1, a 2022 Rally1 car built by the M-Sport Ford World Rally Team
 Ford Duratorq ZSD "Puma", a line of 2.0-litre, 2.2-litre, and 2.4-litre engines
 Ford Escort RS2000, originally intended to be called the Puma

References